The Second Assembly of Pondicherry Deuxième Assemblée de Pondichéry (29 August 1964 - 19 September 1968) succeeded the First Assembly of Pondicherry and was constituted after the victory of Indian National Congress (INC) and allies in the 1964 assembly election held on 23 August 1964. Venkatasubba Reddiar assumed office as 2nd Pondicherry. These were the first Legislative Assembly elections after the formation of the new Union Territory.

Background
The Pondicherry Representative Assembly was converted into the Legislative Assembly of Pondicherry on 1 July 1963 as per Section 54(3) of The Union Territories Act, 1963 and its members were deemed to have been elected to the First Assembly. All the 30 members of this assembly were elected through direct suffrage, under the Government of Union Territories Act, 1963. However, its term was fixed to expire on 24 August 1964. This necessitated the 1964 assembly election to constitute the Second Assembly of Pondicherry.

Reduction in size of assembly
Under the provisions of The Union Territories Act, 1963, the strength of the Legislative Assembly of Pondicherry has been reduced to 30. Similarly, Five seats were reserved for Scheduled Castes. Out of them, four were reserved in Pondicherry and the remaining one in Karikal.

Important members
 Speaker:
M.O.H. Farook from 19 September 1964 to 19 March 1967
P. Shanmugam from 30 March 1967 to 9 March 1968
 Chief minister:
 V. Venkatasubba Reddiar from  29 August 1964 - 19 September 1968
 Leader of opposition:
 V. Subbiah from  29 August 1964 - 19 September 1968

Members elected
Keys:

Pondicherry Region

Karikal Region

Mahe Region

Yanam Region

See also 
Government of Puducherry
List of Chief Ministers of Puducherry
Puducherry Legislative Assembly
Pondicherry Representative Assembly
1964 Pondicherry Legislative Assembly election

References

Notes

Puducherry Legislative Assembly
Puducherry
1964 establishments in Pondicherry